Sadrac Saintil is a Haitian military officer, who is currently serving as the Commander-in-Chief of the Armed Forces of Haiti since 27 March 2018.

Saintil, then a lieutenant colonel, participated in the official whitewash of the 1994 Raboteau massacre, during the military dictatorship of Raoul Cédras.

References

Year of birth missing (living people)
Living people
Haitian military personnel
Haitian generals